Sachihiko is a masculine Japanese given name. Notable people with the name include:

, Japanese painter
, Japanese sport wrestler

Japanese masculine given names